Ahad Pazaj (born June 22, 1970 in Ardabil, Iran) was an Iranian Greco-Roman wrestler, and coach of Iranian Greco-Roman wrestling team.

References

External links
 
 

1970 births
People from Ardabil
Living people
Olympic wrestlers of Iran
Wrestlers at the 1988 Summer Olympics
Wrestlers at the 1992 Summer Olympics
Wrestlers at the 1996 Summer Olympics
Iranian male sport wrestlers
Asian Games medalists in wrestling
Wrestlers at the 1990 Asian Games
Asian Games bronze medalists for Iran
Medalists at the 1990 Asian Games
20th-century Iranian people
21st-century Iranian people